Sugar is a 2019 Ghanaian musical romantic comedy which tells the story of an award-winning musician who allows fame to turn him into a womanizer resulting in a breakup with his long-term girlfriend. He then spirals out of control and then meets a woman who makes him change his ways until everything is challenged when his past catches up with him.

The movie was written by Richie Mensah, screenplay by Ken Sackey, produced by Lynx Entertainment and directed by Ghanaian music video director Rex. It stars singer-songwriter KiDi in his acting debut alongside renowned actors Adjetey Anang, James Gardiner and Kalybos.

Cast 
 KiDi
 Adjetey Anang
 Cina Soul
 James Gardiner
 Derick Kobina Bonney (DKB)
 Fella Makafui
 Kalybos
 Dela Seade
 Veana Negasi
 Richmond Amoakoh

References

External links 
 

2019 films
Ghanaian comedy films
Ghanaian musical films
2019 romantic comedy films
2010s musical comedy films
2010s romantic musical films